The Subic Forest is a national forest protected area that extends from Subic Bay National Park up the northwestern volcanic slope of Mount Natib in Bataan National Park in the Philippines.

Location
The Subic Forest is located on western Luzon island in Bataan, Central Luzon near the Angeles area east of Manila. It is in the Luzon Montane Rainforests Ecoregion.

See also
Luzon tropical pine forests
Tropical and subtropical moist broadleaf forests

National forests
Forests of the Philippines
Tropical and subtropical moist broadleaf forests
Geography of Zambales
Geography of Bataan